This is the list of awards and nominations received by American hip hop duo Outkast.

American Music Awards

! R
|-
| align="center" | 2003 || Outkast || Favorite Soul/R&B Band/Duo/Group ||  || 
|-
| align="center" rowspan="4" | 2004 || rowspan="3" | Outkast || Artist of the Year ||  || rowspan="4" | 
|-
| Favorite Pop/Rock Band/Duo/Group || 
|-
| Favorite Rap/Hip-Hop Band/Duo/Group || 
|-
| Speakerboxxx/The Love Below || Favorite Rap/Hip-Hop Album || 
|}

BET Awards

! R
|-
| align="center" rowspan="2" | 2001 || "Ms. Jackson" || Video of the Year ||  || rowspan="2" | 
|-
| Outkast || Best Group || 
|-
| align="center" | 2002 || Outkast || Best Group ||  || 
|-
| align="center" rowspan="5" | 2004 || rowspan="2" | "Hey Ya!" || Video of the Year ||  || rowspan="5" | 
|-
| Viewer's Choice || 
|-
| rowspan="2" | "The Way You Move"  || Video of the Year || 
|-
| Best Collaboration || 
|-
| Outkast || Best Group || 
|-
| align="center" | 2007 || Outkast || Best Group ||  || 
|-
| align="center" | 2008 || "International Players Anthem (I Choose You)"  || Video of the Year ||  || 
|}

BET Hip Hop Awards

! R
|-
| align="center" rowspan="2" | 2007 || rowspan="2" | "International Players Anthem (I Choose You)"  || Best Collaboration ||  || rowspan="2" | 
|-
| Best Video || 
|}

Black Reel Awards

|-
| align="center" rowspan="2" | 2007 || Idlewild || Outstanding Original Score || 
|-
| "Idlewild Blue (Don'tchu Worry 'Bout Me)" || Outstanding Original Song || 
|}

Brit Awards

! R
|-
| align="center" rowspan="2" | 2004 || Speakerboxxx/The Love Below || International Album ||  || rowspan="2" | 
|-
| Outkast || International Group || 
|-
| align="center" rowspan="2" | 2005 || Speakerboxxx/The Love Below || International Album ||  || rowspan="2" | 
|-
| Outkast || International Group || 
|}

Grammy Awards

|-
| align="center" | 1999 || "Rosa Parks" || Best Rap Performance by a Duo or Group || 
|-
| align="center" rowspan="5" | 2002 || rowspan="3" | "Ms. Jackson" || Record of the Year || 
|-
| Best Rap Performance by a Duo or Group || 
|-
| Best Music Video || 
|-
| rowspan="2" | Stankonia || Album of the Year || 
|-
| Best Rap Album || 
|-
| align="center" | 2003 || "The Whole World"  || Best Rap Performance by a Duo or Group || 
|-
| align="center" rowspan="6" | 2004 || rowspan="3" | "Hey Ya!" || Record of the Year || 
|-
| Best Urban/Alternative Performance || 
|-
| Best Music Video || 
|-
| rowspan="2" | Speakerboxxx/The Love Below || Album of the Year || 
|-
| Best Rap Album || 
|-
| Outkast || Producer of the Year, Non-Classical || 
|-
| align="center" rowspan="2" | 2007 || "Idlewild Blue (Don't Chu Worry 'Bout Me)" || Best Urban/Alternative Performance || 
|-
| "Mighty O" || Best Rap Performance by a Duo or Group || 
|-
| align="center" | 2008 || "International Players Anthem (I Choose You)"  || Best Rap Performance by a Duo or Group || 
|}

MTV Europe Music Awards

|-
| align="center" rowspan="3" | 2001 || "Ms. Jackson" || Best Video || 
|-
| rowspan="2" | Outkast || Best Hip-Hop || 
|-
| Best R&B || 
|-
| align="center" rowspan="5" | 2004 || Speakerboxxx/The Love Below || Best Album || 
|-
| rowspan="2" | "Hey Ya!" || Best Song || 
|-
| Best Video || 
|-
| rowspan="2" | Outkast || Best Group || 
|-
| Best R&B || 
|-
| align="center" | 2006 || Outkast || Best R&B || 
|}

MTV Video Music Awards

|-
| align="center" rowspan="2" | 2001 || rowspan="2" | "Ms. Jackson" || Best Hip-Hop Video || 
|-
| Best Direction || 
|-
| align="center" | 2002 || "The Whole World"  || Best Hip-Hop Video || 
|-
| align="center" rowspan="5" | 2004 || rowspan="5" | "Hey Ya!" || Video of the Year || 
|-
| Best Hip-Hop Video || 
|-
| Best Direction || 
|-
| Best Visual Effects || 
|-
| Best Art Direction || 
|}

MTV Video Music Awards Japan

|-
| align="center" rowspan="3" | 2004 || Speakerboxxx/The Love Below || Album of the Year || 
|-
| rowspan="2" | "Hey Ya!" || Video of the Year || 
|-
| Best Pop Video || 
|}

Nickelodeon Kids' Choice Awards

|-
| align="center" rowspan="2" | 2004 || "Hey Ya!" || Favorite Song || 
|-
| Outkast || Favorite Music Group || 
|-
| align="center" | 2005 || Outkast || Favorite Music Group || 
|}

Soul Train Music Awards

|-
| align="center" | 1997 || ATLiens || Best Album of the Year || 
|-
| align="center" | 1999 || Aquemini || Best R&B/Soul Album – Group, Band or Duo || 
|-
| align="center" | 2001 || "Ms. Jackson" || Best Video of the Year || 
|-
| align="center" rowspan="3" | 2004 || Speakerboxxx/The Love Below || Best Album of the Year || 
|-
| Outkast || Sammy Davis Jr. – Entertainer of the Year || 
|-
| "Hey Ya!" || Best Video of the Year || 
|-
| align="center" | 2005 || "Roses" || Best Video of the Year || 
|}

The Source Awards

|-
| align="center" rowspan="2" | 1995 || Outkast || New Artist of the Year, Group || 
|-
| Southernplaylisticadillacmuzik || Album of the Year || 
|}

Teen Choice Awards

|-
| align="center" rowspan="2" | 2001 || Outkast || Choice Music: R&B/Hip Hop Artist || 
|-
| "Ms. Jackson" || Choice Music: R&B/Hip Hop Track || 
|-
| align="center" rowspan="4" | 2004 || Speakerboxxx/The Love Below || Choice Music: Album || 
|-
| rowspan="2" | "The Way You Move"  || Choice Music: Hook Up || 
|-
| Choice Music: Hip-Hop/Rap Track || 
|-
| "Hey Ya!" || Choice Music: Single || 
|}

References

Awards
Lists of awards received by American musician
Lists of awards received by musical group